Richard Packard is an American physicist, a professor at the University of California, Berkeley, known for discovering Josephson oscillations in superfluids and using related effects to build the first quantum gyroscope with his colleagues. He is also recognized for making the first visualization of quantum vortices as well as conceiving  the idea that neutron stars suddenly speed up due to metastability of superfluid vortices in the star's interior. He also suggested a model for the nature of dark matter by drawing an analogy between cosmic strings and quantized vortex lines. His research is primarily focused on the application of quantum fluids.

References

University of California, Berkeley faculty
Scientists from the San Francisco Bay Area
21st-century American physicists
Living people
Year of birth missing (living people)